Hasselback potatoes or Potato à la Hasselbacken (Swedish: Hasselbackspotatis) are a type of baked potato that is cut about halfway through into thin, fan-like slices.

They can be served as a main course, side dish, or canapé. Various toppings can be added, such as caraway seeds, paprika, and bread crumbs.

Origins
Hasselback potatoes may have been created in 1953 by Leif Elisson, a trainee chef at Hasselbacken restaurant on Djurgården, Stockholm.

However, there is a recipe for "Oven Fried Potatoes (Hasselback Potatoes )" in the 1929  "Prinsessornas kokbok"(The cookbook of Princesses) by Jenny Åkerström, leading to some question as to whether the recipe does in fact originate at the restaurant.

References

Potato dishes
Swedish cuisine